Anton Bulaev (born 20 July 1996) is a Russian archer competing in men's compound events. He won, alongside Natalia Avdeeva, the gold medal in the mixed team compound event at the 2019 European Games held in Minsk, Belarus.

Career 

He competed at the 2013 World Archery Youth Championships held in Wuxi, China and he won the gold medal in the mixed team compound event.

In 2017, he won the gold medal in the men's team compound event at the Summer Universiade held in Taipei, Taiwan. At the 2018 European Archery Championships in Legnica, Poland he won the gold medal in the men's individual compound event.

In 2019, Buleav won the gold medal in the men's individual compound event at the Summer Universiade held in Naples, Italy.

He competed at the 2021 World Archery Championships held in Yankton, United States.

References

External links 
 

Living people
1996 births
Place of birth missing (living people)
Russian male archers
European Games medalists in archery
European Games gold medalists for Russia
Archers at the 2019 European Games
Universiade medalists in archery
Universiade gold medalists for Russia
Medalists at the 2017 Summer Universiade
Medalists at the 2019 Summer Universiade
21st-century Russian people